The 1987 World Women's Hockey Tournament was held April 21–26, 1987, in North York, Toronto, Ontario. It was the first major world tournament for national women's ice hockey teams and was the first unofficial tournament before the International Ice Hockey Federation (IIHF) launched the Women's World Championship in 1990. The Ontario Women's Hockey Association (OWHA) hosted the tournament and director Fran Rider is credited as the driving force behind the event's success. The six-day tournament was held at the North York Centennial Arena, now called the Carnegie Centennial Centre.

Delegates from the participating nations and five additional countries met during the tournament to establish a strategy to lobby the International Ice Hockey Federation for the creation of a Women's World Championship. The success of the tournament and the positive reports presented to the IIHF gave women's ice hockey the legitimacy needed to pave the way for the creation of the modern Women's World Championship.

Team Canada won the tournament defeating Team Ontario by 4–0 in the final game. The championship trophy was named the Hazel McCallion World Cup, in honor of Mississauga mayor and women's ice hockey advocate Hazel McCallion.

Teams

The following teams played at the tournament. It is assumed that these teams were selected on an invitational basis, but that is not confirmed.

 Ontario

 was scheduled to participate but pulled out shortly before the tournament, possibly due to displeasure with the choice to not allow body checking.

The Swedish team was able to travel to and participate in the tournament because of the sponsorship of Toronto Maple Leafs defenceman, Börje Salming.

Venue
The six-day tournament was held at the North York Centennial Arena, now called the Carnegie Centennial Centre.

Format

The seven participating teams played in a single round robin tournament format. The top four teams from the group proceeded to the Medal Round, while the remaining teams played in the placement games.

Games were 45 minutes long, three periods of fifteen minutes each.

Group stage

Round robin

Standings

Results

Playoff stage

Placing Round

5th/6th-place game

Medal round

Semi-finals

Bronze-medal game

Final

Champions

Final standings

Awards

References

IIHF Women's World Ice Hockey Championships
World
1987
April 1987 sports events in Canada
Women's ice hockey competitions in Canada
1987 in Ontario
1987 in women's sport
Ice hockey competitions in Toronto